Coprosma is a genus of flowering plants in the family Rubiaceae. It is found in New Zealand, Hawaiian Islands, Borneo, Java, New Guinea, islands of the Pacific Ocean to Australia and the Juan Fernández Islands.

Description
The name Coprosma means "smelling like dung" and refers to the smell (methanethiol) given out by the crushed leaves of a few species.

Many species are small shrubs with tiny evergreen leaves, but a few are small trees and have much larger leaves. The flowers have insignificant petals and are wind-pollinated, with long anthers and stigmas. Most species are dioecious, but some (particularly those native to New Zealand) species can sometimes have individuals with perfect flowers. Natural hybrids are common. The fruit is a non-poisonous juicy berry, most often bright orange (but can be dark red or even light blue), containing two small seeds. The orange fruit of the larger species were eaten by Māori children, and are also popular with birds. It is said that coffee can be made from the seeds, Coprosma being related to the coffee plants. A notable feature (also found in other genera of Rubiaceae) is that the leaves contain hollows in the axils of the veins; in these, and on the leaf stipules, nitrogen-fixing bacteria grow. In addition the hollows, or domatia, encourage certain kinds of mites to take up residence, which feed on and reduce parasitic fungi which attack the leaf.

Species

Coprosma acerosa A.Cunn. - tataraheke/sand coprosma - New Zealand (incl. Stewart Island and Chatham Islands)
Coprosma acutifolia Hook.f. - Raoul Island
Coprosma arborea Kirk - tree coprosma, mamangi - New Zealand
 Merr. & L.M.Perry - New Guinea
Coprosma × arcuata Colenso - C. propinqua × C. robusta - New Zealand North Island
Coprosma areolata Cheeseman - thin-leaved coprosma - New Zealand (incl. Stewart Island)
Coprosma atropurpurea (Cockayne & Allan) L.B.Moore - New Zealand South Island
Coprosma barbata Utteridge - New Guinea
Coprosma baueri Endl. - Norfolk Island and Phillip Island
 W.R.B.Oliv. - Pitcairn Islands
Coprosma bougainvilleensis Gideon - Solomon Islands
 Merr. & L.M.Perry - New Guinea
Coprosma × buchananii Kirk - C. crassifolia × C. robusta - southern New Zealand North Island
 Cockayne - Chatham Islands
 W.R.B.Oliv. - New Zealand (incl. Stewart Island)
Coprosma ciliata Hook.f. - tree 7m tall - New Zealand, Antipodes Islands
Coprosma colensoi Hook.f. - New Zealand (incl. Stewart Island)
Coprosma × conferta A.Cunn. - C. propinqua × C. robusta - New Zealand
 Fosberg - Tuha'a Pae
Coprosma cordicarpa Cantley, Spock-Koehler, and Chau - Maui
Coprosma crassifolia Colenso - stiff, red-brown branches - New Zealand
Coprosma crenulata W.R.B.Oliv. - New Zealand (incl. Stewart Island)
Coprosma cuneata Hook.f. - New Zealand South Island, Stewart Island, Antipodes Islands
 Hillebr. - Northwestern Hawaiian Islands
Coprosma decurva Heads - New Zealand
Coprosma depressa Colenso ex Hook.f. - New Zealand (incl. Stewart Island)
 W.R.B.Oliv. - Papua New Guinea
Coprosma dodonaeifolia W.R.B.Oliv. - Great Barrier Island
Coprosma dumosa (Cheeseman) G.T.Jane - New Zealand
Coprosma elatirioides de Lange & A.S.Markey - New Zealand South Island
Coprosma elegans Utteridge - New Guinea
 W.R.B.Oliv. - Kauai
Coprosma ernodeoides A.Gray - Hawaii, Maui
Coprosma esulcata (F.Br.) Fosberg - Marquesas Islands 
 W.L.Wagner & Lorence - Marquesas Islands
Coprosma fernandeziana ined. - Robinson Crusoe Island
Coprosma foetidissima J.R.Forst. & G.Forst. - Stinkwood, a small New Zealand tree with foul-smelling leaves
 A.Gray - Hawaiian Islands
Coprosma fowerakeri D.A.Norton & de Lange - New Zealand South Island
Coprosma glabrata J.W.Moore - Raiatea
Coprosma × gracilicaulis Carse - C. rotundifolia × C. tenuicaulis - New Zealand North Island
Coprosma × gracilis A.Cunn. - C. lucida × C. rhamnoides - New Zealand North Island
Coprosma grandifolia Hook.f. kanono, a large bush with leaves 15 cm long or more; its bark contains an orange dye - New Zealand
Coprosma hirtella Labill. - Tasmania, Victoria, New South Wales
Coprosma hookeri Stapf - Sabah
Coprosma huttoniana P.S.Green - Lord Howe Island
Coprosma inopinata I.Hutton & P.S.Green - Lord Howe Island
Coprosma intertexta G.Simpson - New Zealand South Island
 (A.Gray) A.Heller - Kauai
Coprosma × kirkii  Cheeseman - C. acerosa × C. repens - New Zealand North Island
Coprosma laevigata Cheeseman - Rarotonga
Coprosma lanceolaris F.Muell. - Lord Howe Island
Coprosma linariifolia (Hook.f.) Hook.f. - mikimiki, yellow wood - New Zealand
 A.Gray - Oahu
Coprosma lucida J.R.Forst. & G.Forst. karamu, a small tree
Coprosma lucida var. angustifolia Cheeseman - New Zealand North Island
Coprosma lucida var. lucida - New Zealand (incl. Stewart Island)
Coprosma macrocarpa Cheeseman large-seeded coprosma - New Zealand North Island (incl. Three Kings Islands)
 A.Gray - Hawaiian Islands
 W.L.Wagner & Lorence - Marquesas Islands
Coprosma microcarpa Hook.f. -  New Zealand
Coprosma × molokaiensis H.St.John - C. ochracea × C. ternata - Molokai
 Hillebr. - Hawaii, eastern Maui
Coprosma moorei F.Muell. ex Rodway - Tasmania, Victoria
Coprosma myrtifolia Noronha - Java
Coprosma × neglecta Cheeseman - C. repens × C. rhamnoides - New Zealand North Island
Coprosma nephelephila J.Florence - Marquesas Islands
Coprosma niphophila Orchard - New Zealand South Island, New South Wales
Coprosma nitida Hook.f. - Tasmania, Victoria, New South Wales
 W.R.B.Oliv. - Tasmania, Victoria, New South Wales
 W.R.B.Oliv. - Vanuatu
Coprosma obconica Kirk
Coprosma obconica subsp. distantia de Lange & R.O.Gardner - New Zealand North Island 
Coprosma obconica subsp. obconica - New Zealand
Coprosma ochracea W.R.B.Oliv. - Hawaiian Islands
Coprosma oliveri Fosberg - Robinson Crusoe Island
Coprosma papuensis W.R.B.Oliv.
Coprosma papuensis subsp. discolor (P.Royen) R.O.Gardner - New Guinea
Coprosma papuensis subsp. mopaensis R.O.Gardner - New Guinea 
Coprosma papuensis subsp. papuensis - New Guinea
Coprosma parviflora Hook.f. - Leafy Coprosma - New Zealand
Coprosma pedicellata Molly - New Zealand
Coprosma perpusilla Colenso
Coprosma perpusilla subsp. perpusilla - Tasmania, Victoria, New South Wales, New Zealand (incl. Stewart Island)
Coprosma perpusilla subsp. subantarctica Orchard - Macquarie Island, Antipodes Islands
 A.Gray - Fiji
Coprosma petiolata Hook.f. - Kermadec Islands
Coprosma petriei Cheeseman - mirror plant - New Zealand
Coprosma pilosa Endl. - Norfolk Island
 W.R.B.Oliv. - New Zealand South Island (incl. Stewart Island)
Coprosma prisca W.R.B.Oliv. - Lord Howe Island
Coprosma propinqua A.Cunn. - mingimingi
Coprosma propinqua var. latiuscula Allan - New Zealand
 W.R.B.Oliv. - Chatham Islands
Coprosma propinqua var.  propinqua - New Zealand (incl. Stewart Island)
Coprosma pseudociliata G.T.Jane - New Zealand
Coprosma pseudocuneata W.R.B.Oliv. - New Zealand
 A.Gray - Hawaiian Islands
Coprosma pumila Hook.f. - Tasmania, Victoria
Coprosma putida C.Moore & F.Muell. - Lord Howe Island
Coprosma pyrifolia (Hook. & Arn.) Skottsb. - Juan Fernández Islands
Coprosma quadrifida (Labill.) Rob. - Tasmania, Victoria, New South Wales
Coprosma raiateensis J.W.Moore - Raiatea
Coprosma rapensis F.Br. - Tuha'a Pae, Pitcairn Islands
Coprosma repens A.Rich. - taupata, mirror plant - native to New Zealand, naturalized in Australia (Tasmania, Victoria, New South Wales, South Australia)
Coprosma reticulata J.Florence - Marquesas Islands
Coprosma rhamnoides A.Cunn. - twiggy coprosma - New Zealand (incl. Stewart Island)
 A.Gray - Hawaii
Coprosma rigida Cheeseman - New Zealand
Coprosma robusta Raoul - karamu - New Zealand, Chatham Is., naturalized in Australia (Tasmania, Victoria)
Coprosma rotundifolia A.Cunn. - New Zealand (incl. Stewart Island)
Coprosma rubra Petrie - New Zealand
Coprosma rugosa Cheeseman - needle-leaved mountain coprosma - New Zealand, Antipodes Islands
 Rech. - Samoa
Coprosma serrulata Hook.f. ex Buchanan - New Zealand South Island
 J.W.Moore - Raiatea
Coprosma spathulata A.Cunn.
Coprosma spathulata subsp. hikuruana de Lange & Heenan - New Zealand North Island 
Coprosma spathulata subsp. spathulata - New Zealand North Island 
 Hillebr. - Maui
Coprosma strigulosa Lauterb. - Samoa
Coprosma sundana Miq. - Java
Coprosma × tadgellii W.R.B.Oliv. - C. nitida × C. nivalis - Victoria
Coprosma tahitensis A.Gray - Tahiti, Tuha'a Pae
Coprosma talbrockiei L.B.Moore & R.Mason - Victoria, New Zealand South Island
 W.L.Wagner & Lorence - Marquesas Islands
Coprosma tenuicaulis Hook. - swamp coprosma - New Zealand
Coprosma tenuifolia Cheeseman - wavy-leaved coprosma - New Zealand North Island
 W.R.B.Oliv. - Molokai
 Fosberg - Tuha'a Pae
Coprosma virescens Petrie - New Zealand
Coprosma waima A.P.Druce - New Zealand North Island
Coprosma waimeae Wawra - Kauai
Coprosma wallii Petrie - New Zealand South Island
Coprosma wollastonii Wernham
Coprosma wollastonii var. epiphytica (P.Royen) R.O.Gardner - New Guinea
Coprosma wollastonii var. novoguineensis (Merr. & L.M.Perry) R.O.Gardner - New Guinea
Coprosma wollastonii var. wollastonii - Sulawesi, New Guinea

References

External links

 Coprosma in the World Checklist of Rubiaceae
 Coprosma specimens and botanical drawings in the collection of the Museum of New Zealand Te Papa Tongarewa
 Entry in Te Ara: An Encyclopaedia of New Zealand, 1966
 Coprosma description: Landcare Research

 
Anthospermeae
Rubiaceae genera
Dioecious plants